The 2018–19 Nemzeti Bajnokság III is Hungary's third-level football competition.

On 11 July 2018, the three groups of the new season was finalised.

Teams

Changes

Standings

West

Centre

East

Season statistics

Top goalscorers - West

Updated to games played on 2 June 2019

Top goalscorers - Centre

Updated to games played on 2 June 2019

Top goalscorers - East

Updated to games played on 2 June 2019

See also
 2018–19 Magyar Kupa
 2019 Magyar Kupa Final
 2018–19 Nemzeti Bajnokság I
 2018–19 Nemzeti Bajnokság II

References

External links
  
  

Nemzeti Bajnokság III seasons
2018–19 in Hungarian football
Hun